Take Me To Your Leader is the third album by ¡Mayday! and debut album on Tech N9ne and Travis O'Guin's Strange Music, independent record label. The album was released on March 26, 2012, after being pushed forward a day from March 27. An instrumental version of the album was later released on January 29, 2013 entitled Take Me To Your Speakers.

Background
¡Mayday! signed to Strange Music in April 2011. Take Me To Your Leader was announced in late 2011 after ¡Mayday! appeared on 3 tracks of Tech N9ne's Welcome to Strangeland: "The Noose", "Retrogression" and "EMJ (Emotional Musical Journey)".

Reception
Travis O'Guin, CEO of Strange Music, considers the album to be the best work ever released on the label, going on to say he only felt this way before about Tech N9ne's Anghellic. HipHopDX gave the album 4 stars out of 5, describing it as "an extremely well-written album that actually means something".

Track listing

Charts

References

External links
Facebook.com
Hopsinforums.com
Xxlmag.com
Djbooth.net
Hiphopdx.com

2012 albums
¡Mayday! albums
Strange Music albums